
Year 719 (DCCXIX) was a common year starting on Sunday (link will display the full calendar) of the Julian calendar. The denomination 719 for this year has been used since the early medieval period, when the Anno Domini calendar era became the prevalent method in Europe for naming years.

Events 
 By place 
 Byzantine Empire 
 Ex-Emperor Anastasios II starts a revolt against Leo III with considerable support, including auxiliaries provided by Tervel, emperor (khagan) of the Bulgarian Empire. His attack on Constantinople fails; Anastasios is captured and is put to death (by beheading), on the orders of Leo.

 Europe 
 Umayyad conquest of Gaul (first major Muslim attack upon Visigothic Septimania, in southern France):  Governor Al-Samh takes or re-takes Narbonne (Arbouna for the Arabs), before raiding the Toulouse area. Many town defenders and inhabitants are killed in the aftermath by the Umayyad forces.
 Frisian–Frankish War: Charles Martel defeats Redbad, King of the Frisians. He easily invades Frisia (modern Netherlands) and subjugates the territory. Charles also crosses the Rhine and annexes "farther" Frisia, to the banks of the River Vlie.
 Duke Grimoald becomes sole ruler of Bavaria, after the deaths of his brothers Theodbert, Theobald, and Tassilo II. He reunites the duchy after a civil war, and makes his capital Salzburg (approximate date).
 May – Chilperic II is raised on the shield after the death of Chlothar IV, and recognized by Charles Martel as king (roi fainéant) of the Franks. Charles, however, gains a monopoly on power and royal offices.

 By topic 
 Religion 
 The Church of Nubia transfers its allegiance, from the Eastern Orthodox Church to the Coptic Church (approximate date).

Births 
 Guan Bo, chancellor of the Tang Dynasty (d. 797)
 Isma'il ibn Jafar, Shī‘ah Imām and scholar (or 722) 
 Yang Guifei, concubine of Xuan Zong (d. 756)

Deaths 
 Anastasios II, Byzantine emperor
 Chlothar IV, king of Austrasia (approximate date)
 Dae Jo-yeong, king of Balhae (Korea)
 Muhammad ibn Marwan, Arab general (or 720)
 Pega, Anglo-Saxon anchoress (approximate date) 
 Radbod, king of the Frisians
 Tassilo II, duke of Bavaria (approximate date)
 Theobald, duke of Bavaria (or 717) 
 Theodbert, duke of Bavaria (approximate date)

References